The 2017−18 Bulgarian Cup was the 36th official edition of the Bulgarian annual football knockout tournament. The competition began on 19 September 2017 with the first round and finished with the final on 9 May 2018. Botev Plovdiv were the defending champions, but lost on away goals in the semi-finals to Slavia Sofia. Slavia later won the final on penalties against Levski Sofia, thus acquiring its eight Bulgarian Cup in its history. The club also qualified for the first qualifying round of the 2018–19 UEFA Europa League.

Participating clubs
The following 32 teams qualified for the competition:

Matches

Round of 32
The draw was conducted on 24 August 2017. The games will be played between 19 and 21 September 2017. On this stage all of the participants started their participation i.e. the 14 teams from First League, the 15 non-reserve teams from Second League and the 3 winners from the regional amateur competitions.

Round of 16
The draw was conducted on 26 September 2017. The games will be played between 24 and 26 October 2017. On this stage the participants will be the 16 winners from the first round.

Quarter-finals
The draw was conducted on 1 November 2017. The games will be played between 12 and 15 December 2017. In this stage the participants will be the 8 winners from the second round.

Semi-finals
The draw was conducted on 19 December 2017. The first legs will be played on 10 and 11 April and the second legs are scheduled for 24 and 25 April 2018.

First legs

Second legs

Final

The final took place on 9 May at Vasil Levski National Stadium in Sofia.

Bracket

Top goalscorers

Notes

References

Bulgarian Cup seasons
Bulgarian Cup
Cup